Dangerous Moves is a 1984 French-language film about chess, directed by Richard Dembo, produced by Arthur Cohn, starring Michel Piccoli, Alexandre Arbatt, as well as Liv Ullmann, Leslie Caron, and Bernhard Wicki in prominent supporting roles.

Its original French title is La diagonale du fou ("The Fool's Diagonal", referring to the chess piece called the bishop in English but the fool in French). The film was a co-production between companies in France and Switzerland. It tells the story of two very different men competing in the final match of the World Chess Championship. One is a 52-year-old Soviet Jew who holds the title, and the other is a 35-year-old genius who defected to the West several years earlier.

Cast
 Michel Piccoli as Akiva Liebskind 
 Alexandre Arbatt as Pavius Fromm 
 Liv Ullmann as Marina Fromm 
 Leslie Caron as Henia Liebskind 
 Wojciech Pszoniak as Felton, Fromm's team
 Jean-Hugues Anglade as Miller, Fromm's team
 Daniel Olbrychski as Tac-Tac, Liebskind's friend
 Hubert Saint-Macary as Foldes 
 Michel Aumont as Kerossian, Liebskind's friend
 Pierre Michaël as Yachvili 
 Serge Avedikian as Fadenko 
 Pierre Vial as Anton Heller 
 Bernhard Wicki as Puhl, arbiter
 Jacques Boudet as Stuffli 
 Benoît Régent as Barabal

Awards
The film won the Academy Award for Best Foreign Language Film in 1984; it was submitted by the Swiss government, and gave that nation its first Oscar win. It also won the Louis Delluc Prize, the Prix de l'Académie du Cinéma and the César Award for Best Debut.

Soundtrack
The CD soundtrack composed by Gabriel Yared is available on Music Box Records label (website).

See also
 List of submissions to the 57th Academy Awards for Best Foreign Language Film
 List of Swiss submissions for the Academy Award for Best Foreign Language Film

References

External links

1984 films
French thriller drama films
Swiss thriller drama films
1980s French-language films
Films about chess
Best Foreign Language Film Academy Award winners
Chess in France
1984 in chess
Cold War films
Films scored by Gabriel Yared
Gaumont Film Company films
Louis Delluc Prize winners
Best First Feature Film César Award winners
1984 directorial debut films
French-language Swiss films
1980s French films